Victor Bers (born August 30, 1944) is an American philologist and classicist. He serves as Professor Emeritus of Classics at Yale University, where he taught since 1972 before retiring in 2018. Prior to retiring, he served as a Director of the American Philological Association (now Society for Classical Studies). Bers is the son of mathematician Lipman Bers.

Biography

Early life and education 
Bers was born on August 30, 1944, in Providence, Rhode Island; he is the son of the mathematician Lipman Bers, who created the theory of pseudoanalytic functions. Bers was educated at Albert Leonard Junior High School and New Rochelle High School, matriculating at the University of Chicago, where he would graduate with a bachelor's degree with distinction. Afterwards, he attained a Woodrow Wilson Fellowship to study at New College, Oxford, where he would obtain a second degree. In 1972, he completed studies for his Doctor of Philosophy at Harvard University. His dissertation was entitled "Enallage and Greek Style." That same year, he joined the faculty of Yale University.

Career 
In 1975, Bers was appointed a fellow at Yale. He would spend the majority of his career at the university, becoming a full-time professor in 1989. In 1999, he was named a Director of the American Philological Association.

Publications

Books

References

External links 
 Page at Semantic Scholar
 Page at Academia

University of Chicago alumni
Alumni of the University of Oxford
Harvard University alumni
Yale University faculty